René Bougnol (7 January 1911 – 20 June 1956) was a French fencer. He won two gold medals and a silver at three different Olympics in the team foil event.

References

External links
 

1911 births
1956 deaths
French male foil fencers
Olympic fencers of France
Fencers at the 1932 Summer Olympics
Fencers at the 1936 Summer Olympics
Fencers at the 1948 Summer Olympics
Fencers at the 1952 Summer Olympics
Olympic gold medalists for France
Olympic silver medalists for France
Olympic medalists in fencing
Sportspeople from Montpellier
Medalists at the 1932 Summer Olympics
Medalists at the 1936 Summer Olympics
Medalists at the 1948 Summer Olympics
Mediterranean Games gold medalists for France
Mediterranean Games medalists in fencing
Fencers at the 1951 Mediterranean Games
20th-century French people